Justice Julius Sarkodee-Adoo  (8 September 1908 – January 1972) was the second Chief Justice of Ghana during the First Republic.

He studied law at King's College London, was admitted to Inner Temple in 1928, and was called to the Bar in 1932. He replaced the first native Ghanaian chief justice, Sir Kobina Arku Korsah in 1964. He was removed after the coup d'état of 24 February 1966 by the military National Liberation Council government which was formed after the overthrow of Dr. Kwame Nkrumah.

Sarkodee-Adoo died in January 1972 at the Korle-Bu Teaching Hospital in Accra.

References

See also
 Chief Justice of Ghana
 List of judges of the Supreme Court of Ghana
 Supreme Court of Ghana

 
 

Alumni of King's College London
1908 births
1972 deaths
20th-century Ghanaian lawyers
People from Western Region (Ghana)
Justices of the Supreme Court of Ghana
Ghanaian Christians